James M. Glaser is an American political scientist specializing in electoral politics and political behavior. He is currently the Dean of School of Arts and Sciences and a Professor of Political Science at Tufts University.

Education and career
Glaser received his B.A. from Stanford University and his Ph.D. from the University of California, Berkeley. He first joined the Department of Political Science at Tufts in 1991 as an assistant professor. From 2003 to 2010, Glaser served as the university's Dean of Undergraduate Education. He then served as Dean of Academic Affairs for Arts and Sciences from 2010 to 2014.

In 2015, he was named the Dean of the School of Arts and Sciences.

Glaser was appointed to the board of trustees of the Museum of Fine Art, Boston in 2016.

Select publications

Books

He is the co-author (with Timothy J. Ryan) of Changing Minds, if Not Hearts: Political Remedies to Racial Issues University of Pennsylvania Press, 2013. In this book, Glaser and Ryan argue that "although political processes often inflame racial tensions, the tools of politics also can alleviate conflict."

His two previous books, The Hand of the Past in Contemporary Southern Politics, (Yale University Press, 2005) and Race, Campaign Politics, and the Realignment in the South, (Yale University Press, 1996), each received the Southern Political Science Association's V.O. Key Prize awarded to the year's best book on southern politics.

Journal Articles

 Berry, J. M., Glaser, J. 2018. Compromising Positions: Why Republican Partisans are More Rigid than Democrats. Political Science Quarterly, 133(1).
 Addonizio, E. M., Green, D. P., Glaser, J. 2007. Putting the Party Back into Politics: An Experiment Testing Whether Election Day Festivals Increase Voter Turnout. PS: Political Science & Politics, 40(04), 721–727.
 Glaser, J. 2006. Changement et persistance dans la vie politique du Sud des États-Unis. Politique américaine (3), 91–105.
 Glaser, J. 2006. Public support for political compromise on a volatile racial issue: Insight from the survey experiment. Political Psychology, 423–439.
 Glaser, J. 2006. The primary runoff as a remnant of the old South. Electoral Studies, 25(4), 776–790.
 Glaser, J. 2003. Social context and inter-group political attitudes: Experiments in group conflict theory. British Journal of Political Science, 33(04), 607–620.
 Glaser, J. 2002. White voters, black schools: Structuring racial choices with a checklist ballot. American Journal of Political Science, 35–46.
 Glaser, J. 2001. The preference puzzle: Educational differences in racial-political attitudes. Political Behavior, 23(4), 313–334.
 Glaser, J. 2001. When legislators change sides: The implications of party defections in the South. Eye of the Storm: The South and Congress in an Era of Change, 69.
 Glaser, J., Gilens, M. 1997. Interregional migration and political resocialization: A study of racial attitudes under pressure. The Public Opinion Quarterly, 61(1), 72–86.
 Glaser, J. 1997. Toward an explanation of the racial liberalism of American Jews. Political Research Quarterly, 50(2), 437–458.
 Glaser, J. 1996. The challenge of campaign watching: Seven lessons of participant-observation research. PS: Political Science & Politics, 29(03), 533–537.
 Glaser, J. 1995. Black and white perceptions of party differences. Political Behavior, 17(2), 155–177.
 Glaser, J. 1994. Back to the black belt: Racial environment and white racial attitudes in the South. The Journal of Politics, 56(01), 21–41.

References

External links
 Tufts School of Arts and Sciences - About the Dean
 Tufts Political Sciences Dept Website

Living people
Tufts University faculty
People from Boston
Stanford University alumni
University of California, Berkeley alumni
American political scientists
Year of birth missing (living people)